Janja Rebolj (born 29 January 1993) is a Slovenian handball player for RK Zagorje and the Slovenian national team.

She participated at the 2016 European Women's Handball Championship.

References

1993 births
Living people
Slovenian female handball players
People from Trbovlje